Robert E. Lee Monument or General Robert E. Lee Monument or variations may refer to:

 Gen. Robert E. Lee Monument (Marianna, Arkansas), listed on the National Register of Historic Places (NRHP)
 Robert E. Lee Monument (New Orleans, Louisiana), NRHP-listed
 Arlington House, The Robert E. Lee Memorial, Arlington, Virginia, NRHP-listed
 Robert E. Lee Monument (Charlottesville, Virginia), NRHP-listed
 Robert E. Lee Monument (Richmond, Virginia), NRHP-listed

See also
Confederate Monument (disambiguation)